This article lists events that occurred during 2009 in Estonia.

Incumbents
President – Toomas Hendrik Ilves 
Prime Minister – Andrus Ansip

Events
Estonian municipal elections
European Parliament election in Estonia
Click and Grow, indoor gardening company is founded.
23 June – War of Independence Victory Column was unveiled.

Births

Deaths

See also
 2009 in Estonian football
 2009 in Estonian television

References

 
2000s in Estonia
Estonia
Estonia
Years of the 21st century in Estonia